Huntertown is a town in Allen County, Indiana. The population was 9,141 at the time of the 2020 census, making it one of the fastest-growing areas in northeastern Indiana, with a population increase of 90 percent since 2010.

History

Huntertown was originally called "The Opening" because it was a natural forest clearing. Huntertown was first settled circa 1837, founded by William T. Hunter. The village was located along the Lima Plank Road connecting Lima (now Howe) and Fort Wayne. The Perry Centre Seminary was founded in Huntertown in 1856, only to close five years later when the entire faculty and adult students enlisted in the Union Army. The town was platted in 1869, but not incorporated until 1966.

Some of the nation's oldest reliable weather observations are from a nineteenth-century Huntertown farm. Rapin Andrews began keeping meteorological records on July 17, 1839, and continued until his death ten years later. His family continued the observations until April 30, 1874. The diary of weather records was presented to the U.S. Weather Bureau (now the National Weather Service) in 1934.

Huntertown today
Since much of Huntertown's growth has come from people moving from urbanized areas like Fort Wayne to new suburban subdivisions, the expectations for services have increased. For example, the town council expanded from three to five members to lessen the workload. The council now is working on creating a new water plant, a parks board, and a new  park.

The town's weekly newspaper, Northwest News, began operations in the summer of 1997 in the former Huntertown State Bank, site of a 1930s robbery by the John Dillinger gang. Proof of the robbery is still visible today, as there is a bullet hole in the right window of the shop.

Geography
Carroll Road is the southern boundary line between Huntertown and Fort Wayne.

Demographics

As of 2000 the median income for a household in the town in 2000 was $52,250, and the median income for a family was $59,219. Males had a median income of $41,150 versus $28,152 for females. The per capita income for the town was $21,232. About 3.0% of families and 4.2% of the population were below the poverty line, including 6.1% of those under age 18 and 6.3% of those age 65 or over.

2010 census
As of the census of 2010, there were 4,810 people, 1,726 households, and 1,299 families residing in the town. The racial makeup of the town was 93.6% White, 1.4% African American, 0.4% Native American, 2.0% Asian, 0.8% from other races, and 1.9% from two or more races. Hispanic or Latino of any race were 2.3% of the population.

There were 1,726 households, of which 45.8% had children under the age of 18 living with them, 58.8% were married couples living together, 12.1% had a female householder with no husband present, 4.4% had a male householder with no wife present, and 24.7% were non-families. 19.4% of all households were made up of individuals, and 4.7% had someone living alone who was 65 years of age or older. The average household size was 2.79 and the average family size was 3.21.

The median age in the town was 31.5 years. 31.9% of residents were under the age of 18; 7% were between the ages of 18 and 24; 33.4% were from 25 to 44; 21.3% were from 45 to 64; and 6.4% were 65 years of age or older. The gender makeup of the town was 49.2% male and 50.8% female.

2020 census
As of April 1, 2020, the census reported a population of 9,141.

Footnotes

External links
 Town of Huntertown, Indiana website

Towns in Allen County, Indiana
Towns in Indiana
Fort Wayne, IN Metropolitan Statistical Area
Populated places established in 1832
1832 establishments in Indiana